George Kavas (born 26 March 1995) is a Greek sailor. He was educated at the Nautical Lyceum of Peiraeus in Athens, in 2013 he graduated with honours and attended the National Technical University of Athens as a Naval Architect.

Along with his brothers and team mates Alexander Kavas & Theofanis Kavas has won numerous races and championships both in Greece and abroad starting from an early age with the Optimist (dinghy) class and later moving on to 420 (dinghy) and 470 class.

Career highlights

Optimist (dinghy) Racing Category
 2005 -  Athens, Greece  1st Place National Junior Championship 
 2006 -   2nd Overall Balkan Optimist Championship 
 2006 -  Athens, Greece  1st Overall World Championship Junior Qualifier 
 2006 -  Athens, Greece  1st Place National Junior Championship 
 2007 -  Athens, Greece  1st Place National Junior Championship 
 2007 -   3rd Overall Balkan Optimist Championship 
 2007 -  Vigo, Spain  2nd Place Semana Caixanova del Atlantico
 2007 -  Cagliari, Italy  1st Place Optimist World Championship with his brother Theofanis Kavas and 3 more Greek teammates

420 (dinghy) Racing Category
 2010 -  Athens, Greece  1st Place National Championship
 2010 -  Athens, Greece  2nd Overall European Youth Championship
 2011 -  Rafina, Greece  1st Place National Championship
 2011 -  Tavira, Portugal  1st Overall European Championship with his brother Alexander Kavas
 2011 -  Kieler Woche, Germany  3rd Overall European Championship with his brother Alexander Kavas
 2011 -  Nieuwpoort, Belgium  2nd Overall European Youth Championship with his brother Alexander Kavas
 2012 -  Paros, Greece  1st Place National Championship 
 2012 -  Lake Neusiedl, Austria  1st Overall 1st Men and Junior World Championship with his brother Alexander Kavas

470 (dinghy) Racing Category
 2012 - Takapuna, New Zealand  10th Overall World Youth Championship
 2012 - Lake Garda, Italy  4th Overall European Youth Championship
 2012 -  1st Overall Balkan Youth Championship 
 2012 -  2nd Overall Balkan Championship 
 2013 - Athens, Greece  4th Place National Championship
 2013 -  Thessaloniki, Greece  3rd Overall National Championship with his brother Alexander Kavas
 2013 - La Rochelle, France  12th Place in Youth, 33rd Overall World Championship with his brother Alexander Kavas

References

External links
 Official page

1995 births
420 class world champions
Greek male sailors (sport)
Living people
World champions in sailing for Greece